Pieter Fontijn (5 January 1773, in Dordrecht – 10 September 1839, in Dordrecht) was a Dutch painter and drawer.

Fontijn painted primarily portraits and miniatures. His drawings were popular with collectors.  Some of his works can be found at the Dordrechts Museum. He was a member of the Confrerie Pictura.

References

1773 births
1839 deaths
Dutch painters
Dutch male painters
Artists from Dordrecht